RG1 may refer to:
 Ginsenoside Rg1, a bioactive molecule
 a United Kingdom postcode covering Reading area
RG-1 (propellant) is a Russian rocket propellant similar to RP-1
 R1–RG1 (Rodalies de Catalunya), a commuter rail line in Catalonia, Spain

RG-I may refer to:
 Rhamnogalacturonan I, a type of pectin

Ryan Gilchrist (RG-1): the world-renowned golfer and ladies’ man